Željko Senečić (18 January 1933 – 2 January 2018) was a Croatian film and television production designer, film director and screenwriter.

Senečić studied painting at the Zagreb Academy of Fine Arts and scenography at the Zagreb Academy of Drama Arts. His career in filmmaking and production design began in the early 1960s. His most memorable films include the Palme d'Or and Academy Award-winning The Tin Drum (Die Blechtrommel, 1979; directed by Volker Schlöndorff and partially filmed in Zagreb, with Senečić credited as production co-designer) and classics of Croatian cinema such as Rondo (1966), One Song a Day Takes Mischief Away (Tko pjeva zlo ne misli, 1970).

Senečić won four Golden Arena for Best Production Design awards, making him one of the most decorated production designers in Croatian cinema.

He also co-wrote screenplays for films An Event (Događaj, 1969; directed by Vatroslav Mimica) and The House (Kuća, 1975; directed by Bogdan Žižić). Senečić also started directing short films in the late 1970s and then proceeded to make several feature films in the 1990s, such as Delusion (Zavaravanje, 1998) and Dubrovnik Twilight (Dubrovački suton, 1999).

Selected filmography
As production designer
Rondo (1966)
One Song a Day Takes Mischief Away (1970)
 The Bloody Vultures of Alaska (1973)
The Tin Drum (1979)
The Glembays (1988)
Charuga (1992)

References

External links

Željko Senečić biography at Filmski-Programi.hr 
Željko Senečić - scenograf oscarovca i dizajner kafića saborskih zastupnika 

1933 births
2018 deaths
Film people from Zagreb
Croatian production designers
Croatian film directors
Croatian screenwriters
Golden Arena winners
Academy of Fine Arts, University of Zagreb alumni
Academy of Dramatic Art, University of Zagreb alumni
Vladimir Nazor Award winners